John Hugh Smith (1819–1870) was an American Whig politician. He served as the Mayor of Nashville, Tennessee three times, from 1845 to 1846, from 1850 to 1853, and from 1862 to 1865.

Early life
Smith was born in 1819 in Nashville. His father was John H. Smith and his mother, Maria (Combs) Smith.

Career
Smith served as Mayor of Nashville from 1845 to 1846, from 1850 to 1853, and from 1862 to 1865. In 1862, he had been appointed by Tennessee Governor (and future President) Andrew Johnson to replace Richard Boone Cheatham, who was arrested.

After his retirement in 1865, Smith shot at a policeman called Brown in Nashville.

Personal life and death
Smith was never married. He died on July 7, 1870 in Nashville, and he is buried in the Mount Olivet Cemetery.

References

1819 births
1870 deaths
Tennessee Whigs
19th-century American politicians
Mayors of Nashville, Tennessee
Burials at Mount Olivet Cemetery (Nashville)